Mihir Sengupta (1946 – 17 January 2022) was an Indian writer of Bengali literature.

He was best known for his 2005 autobiography Bishaad Brikkho ('Tree of Sorrow'). It describes the atrocities of post-partition East Pakistan as seen by the author, who was uprooted from his native Barisal in present-day Bangladesh and ended up in Calcutta as a refugee. Bishaad Brikkho is regarded as an important literary document of the atrocities of post-partition West Pakistan and won the Ananda Puroshkar literary prize. Sengupta died in Kolkata of blood cancer on 17 January 2022, at the age of 75.

References

1946 births
2022 deaths
Bengali writers
Indian autobiographers
Recipients of the Ananda Purashkar
People from Barisal
Writers from Kolkata